Jonathan Castroviejo Nicolás (born 27 April 1987) is a Spanish professional cyclist, who currently rides for UCI WorldTeam .

Career
Born in Getxo, Basque Country, Spain, Castroviejo spent two seasons with the feeder team of the de facto Basque national squad Orbea, before he joined  in 2010. He won his first race as a professional at the 2011 Tour de Romandie, clocking the fastest time in the  prologue individual time trial, beating reigning under-23 world champion Taylor Phinney by 0.27 seconds. The result came the day before Castroviejo's 24th birthday. His prowess in the time trial was relatively uncommon for a  rider, as the team was known for fielding lightweight climbers with little ability against the clock. The Romandie stage win was, however, not a complete shock – earlier in the season, Castroviejo had finished eighth in the time trial which closed out Tirreno–Adriatico, besting the times of riders such as Gustav Larsson, Cadel Evans, and David Zabriskie, all of whom had reputations as time trial specialists.

He wore the Vuelta a España's general classification jersey for two stages since his team won the opening Team time trial and he crossed the line first, but lost it two days later to teammate Alejandro Valverde. Castroviejo could not follow the frantic pace set by Alberto Contador on the final climb of the third stage.

In 2015, Castroviejo won the Spanish National Time Trial Championships for the second time in his career.

On 17 August 2017, it was announced that Castroviejo would join  for the 2018 season.

Major results

Source: 

2005
 3rd Road race, National Junior Road Championships
2009
 1st Stage 3 Tour du Haut-Anjou
 1st Stage 5 Tour de l'Avenir
 2nd Overall Ronde de l'Isard
1st Prologue
 2nd Overall Circuito Montañés
2010
 1st  Sprints classification, Volta a Catalunya
2011
 1st Prologue Tour de Romandie
 2nd Time trial, National Road Championships
 3rd Overall Vuelta a la Comunidad de Madrid
1st Stage 1 (ITT)
2012
 Vuelta a España
1st Stage 1 (TTT)
 Held after Stages 1–2
 2nd Time trial, National Road Championships
 5th Overall Vuelta a la Comunidad de Madrid
1st  Sprints classification
1st Stage 1 (ITT)
 5th Overall Vuelta a Murcia
1st  Points classification
 6th Overall Eneco Tour
 7th Overall Vuelta a Castilla y León
 9th Time trial, Olympic Games
2013
 1st  Time trial, National Road Championships
 1st  Sprints classification, Vuelta a Asturias
 8th Overall Volta ao Algarve
2014
 Vuelta a España
1st Stage 1 (TTT)
Held  after Stage 1
 3rd Time trial, National Road Championships
 10th Time trial, UCI Road World Championships
2015
 1st  Time trial, National Road Championships
 UCI World Championships
3rd  Team time trial
4th Time trial
 3rd Overall Tour du Poitou-Charentes
2016
 1st  Time trial, UEC European Road Championships
 2nd Time trial, National Road Championships
 2nd Chrono des Nations
 3rd  Time trial, UCI Road World Championships
 4th Time trial, Olympic Games
2017
 1st  Time trial, National Road Championships
 2nd Overall Tour du Poitou-Charentes
 3rd Overall Circuit de la Sarthe
 3rd Chrono des Nations
 7th Overall Tirreno–Adriatico
 7th Overall Volta ao Algarve
1st Stage 3 (ITT)
 10th Overall Volta a la Comunitat Valenciana
2018
 1st  Time trial, National Road Championships
 1st Stage 3 (TTT) Critérium du Dauphiné
 2nd  Time trial, UEC European Road Championships
 6th Time trial, UCI Road World Championships
  Combativity award Stage 19 Vuelta a España
2019
 1st  Time trial, National Road Championships

Grand Tour general classification results timeline

References

External links

Cyclists from the Basque Country (autonomous community)
Spanish male cyclists
1987 births
Living people
Sportspeople from Getxo
Cyclists at the 2012 Summer Olympics
Cyclists at the 2016 Summer Olympics
Olympic cyclists of Spain
Sportspeople from Biscay